Stranger by Night is a 1994 action film directed by Gregory Dark and starring Steven Bauer, Jennifer Rubin and William Katt. It was released on November 23, 1994.

Plot
Detective Bobby Corcoran and his partner, Detective Larson, are on the hunt for a vicious serial killer. As the murderous villain stalks the city streets leaving carnage in his wake, Corcoran begins to experience blackouts and sudden fits of anger. As the detectives pursue the case, they uncover evidence suggesting that one of them may be responsible for the mysterious deaths.

Cast
 Steven Bauer as Bobby Corcoran
 Jennifer Rubin as Dr. Anne Richmond
 William Katt as Troy Rooney
 Michael Parks as Detective Larson
 Luca Bercovici as Stan Richmond
 Michele Greene as Lisa
 J.J. Johnston as Bobby's Father
 Ashley Laurence as Nicole Miller
 Marla Rubinoff as Sammy
 Gary Lee Davis as Henry Herodonti
 Claire Yarlett as Sue Rooney
 Rebecca Rocheford as Melissa

Release
The film was originally released on HBO as a movie of the week. Following the film's original VHS release in America, the film was later released on DVD in 1997 by A-Pix Entertainment, before a "Collector's Edition" was released as part of the "Gold Series" in 2000 by Unapix. In 1998, the film was also released as a double movie feature DVD with the 1994 film The Seventh Floor.

Reception
Sandra Brennan of AllMovie gave the film one and a half stars out of five, and said: "In this crime thriller, a pair of police detectives investigates a series of related killings. As the evidence mounts, it becomes chillingly apparent that one of the two gumshoes is the guilty party." Both Video Movie Guide 2002 and VideoHound's Golden Movie Retriever gave the film two out of five stars.
Entertainment Weekly awarded the film a B− grade and wrote: "Despite obvious plotting and the most annoying soundtrack this side of Flashdance, Stranger by Night is still worth watching for a bravura performance by veteran video star William Katt in a role that would work perfectly in a big-screen Quentin Tarantino version of Starsky and Hutch. Unfortunately, Katt's wonderfully obnoxious cop is only peripheral to this tale of a tough-guy detective Steven Bauer whose alcoholic blackouts are followed by discoveries of dead hookers and a parade of red herrings. None of these do anything but make you wish Katt were on screen more."

References

External links
 

1994 films
1990s thriller films
1990s serial killer films
Films directed by Gregory Dark
Films with screenplays by Daryl Haney
1990s English-language films